Laurel Fork may refer to:

Places

United States
Laurel Fork (Cheat River), a river in West Virginia
Laurel Fork (Clear Fork Guyandotte River), a river in West Virginia
Laurel Fork (North Fork South Branch Potomac River), a stream in Virginia and West Virginia
Laurel Fork (conservation area), a wildland in western Virginia
Laurel Fork Railway in Tennessee
Laurel Fork, Tennessee
Laurel Fork, Virginia
Laurel Fork, West Virginia